The Special Tour is the ongoing concert tour by American singer and rapper Lizzo, in support of her fourth studio album Special (2022). The tour began at the FLA Live Arena in Sunrise, Florida on September 23, 2022, and is set to conclude at the Acrisure Arena in Thousand Palms, California on June 2, 2023.

American rappers Latto and Saucy Santana are supporting all the North American dates on the tour.

Concert film
Lizzo: Live in Concert is a concert special directed by Sam Wrench, which was released on December 31, 2022, exclusively via HBO Max. The film follows American singer and rapper Lizzo's performance at Kia Forum in Inglewood, California on November 18 and 19, 2022.

Setlist
This setlist on represents the Sunrise show, on September 23, 2022, and does not represent the setlist for the entire tour.

"The Sign"
"2 Be Loved (Am I Ready)"
"Soulmate"
"Phone" (Interlude)
"Grrrls"
"Boys"
"Tempo"
"Rumors"
"Scuse Me"
"Fitness" (Interlude)
"Naked"
"Jerome"
"Break Up Twice" 
"Doo Wop (That Thing)"
"Special"
"I'm Every Woman"
"Like A Girl"
"Birthday Girl"  
"Everybody's Gay"
"Water Me"
"Cuz I Love You"
"If You Love Me"
"Coldplay"
"Truth Hurts"
"I Love You Bitch"
"Good As Hell"
Encore
"Juice"
"About Damn Time"

Notes 

 During the first performance in Inglewood, Missy Elliot and Cardi B joined Lizzo on stage to sing "Tempo" and "Rumors", respectively.
 During the second performance in Inglewood, SZA appeared on stage with Lizzo to sing "Special".

Shows

Notes

References

Lizzo concert tours
2022 concert tours
Concert tours of North America
2023 concert tours
Concert tours of Europe